Edayapatti is a village in the Annavasal revenue block of Pudukkottai district, Tamil Nadu, India.

Demographics 
As per the 2001 census, Edayapatti had a total population of 1473 with 731 males and 742 females. The sex ratio was 1015. The literacy rate was 43.31%

References

Villages in Pudukkottai district